Line S4 of Suzhou Rail Transit will be a north–south rapid transit express line. The line will run through Zhangjiagang, Changshu, Xiangcheng, Gusu, Wuzhong, and Wujiang. The line will serve as a rapid connection between the main city of Suzhou and the county-level city of Changshu, and to a lesser extent, Zhangjiagang.

There is no planned construction date, but construction is expected to start before 2035.

References 

Suzhou Rail Transit lines